Race suicide was an alarmist term used in eugenics, coined in 1900 by the sociologist Edward A. Ross. Racial suicide rhetoric suggested a differential birth rate between native-born Protestant and immigrant Catholic women, or more generally between the "fit" or "best" (white, wealthy, educated Protestants), and the "unfit" or "undesirable" (poor, uneducated, criminals, diseased, mental and physical "defectives," and ethnic, racial, and religious minorities), such that the "fit" group would ultimately dwindle to the point of extinction. Belief in race suicide is an element of Nordicism. In anti-East Asian discourse, the concept is associated with the "Yellow Peril".

In 1902, US President Theodore Roosevelt called race suicide "fundamentally infinitely more important than any other question in this country" and argued that "the man or woman who deliberately avoids marriage, and has a heart so cold as to know no passion and a brain so shallow and selfish as to dislike having children, is in effect a criminal against the race, and should be an object of contemptuous abhorrence by all healthy people." Likewise, in 1905, he argued that a man or woman who is childless by choice "merits contempt."

In Canada, the idea of race suicide was espoused by W. Stewart Wallace, the author of "The Canadian Immigration Policy," which cited the native-born population's "struggle to keep up appearances in the face of the increasing competition" as a purported cause of its low birth rate. Wallace claimed that immigrants did not increase a nation's population but merely replaced it.

References

Further reading

</ref>

External links

Eugenics
Anti–East Asian sentiment in the United States
Anti-immigration politics in the United States
Natalism
Nordicism
White genocide conspiracy theory